Snälltåget  is an open access railway company in Sweden with long-distance trains along the Southern Main Line in Sweden from Malmö to Stockholm as well as sleeper trains between Stockholm and Berlin and Malmö to the ski and hiking resorts in Jämtland county.

History
Snälltåget was set up in 2006 (first departure January 31 2007) as Veolia Transport after partial deregulation of the Swedish rail network running ad hoc services. Regular weekend services began in 2009 (expanding to weekdays in 2010), after the network was fully deregulated, running in direct competition with the state-owned operator SJ. The summer night train extension to Berlin was launched in 2012 with the network rebranding as Snälltåget in 2013.

From September 2016, a brand new fleet of Class 193 Vectron locomotives were added to replace the hired commonly used Hector Rail Class 242 Taurus and the Class 241 Traxx. Together with coaches from Germany, they started operation at 200 km/h, the first time for locomotives and railcars in Sweden.

Until 2019 it operated with train ferry via Trelleborg to Sassnitz.  In 2020, this train and the ferry route was cancelled because of the COVID-19 pandemic. From June 2021 a modified night train over the Great Belt Fixed Link without ferry was launched, between Stockholm, Copenhagen and Berlin.

In November 2021, Snälltåget's parent company Transdev expressed its intention to sell the company.

In January 2022, a new overnight service from Malmö to Salzburg via Zell am See and other ski resorts in the Austrian Central Eastern Alps along the Salzburg-Tyrol Railway commenced.

Routes
Snälltåget operates four different routes:

The main route is operated from Malmö to Stockholm via Lund, Hässleholm, Alvesta, Nässjö, Linköping and Norrköping throughout the year.

In hiking and skiing seasons, Snälltåget operates night trains between Malmö and Storlien, via Stockholm and Åre.

Between April and September, as well as on selected days during the rest of the year a night train also operates from Stockholm to Berlin, via Malmö and Hamburg.

In winter, a train runs weekly between Malmö and Innsbruck, via Salzburg and Zell am See, serving multiple stations with connections to Austrian ski resorts. It is the longest train service running within Europe.

Owner
Snälltåget is owned by Transdev.

Notes

References

Railway companies established in 2006
Railway companies of Sweden
Transdev
2006 establishments in Sweden